The Type 1936C destroyer was a planned class of destroyer for the Kriegsmarine. The class was intended to consist of five ships, Z46, Z47, Z48, Z49 and Z50. They were designed to be an improvement of Type 1936A and B destroyers. Only two of the five ships, Z46 and Z47, were ever laid down, and work was halted for a year between 1942 and 1943. Construction was constantly interrupted by numerous problems, dominantly due to air raids, material supply delays and a shortage of copper. The two ships that were laid down, Z46 and Z47, were blown up by Allied troops in 1945.

Characteristics

They were to have a complement of 320, and carry one motor pinnace, one motor yawl, one torpedo cutter and one dinghy.

An advanced radar-controllable fire control system was placed upon the two aft turrets; six  anti-aircraft guns with 12,000 rounds of ammunition, placed in three LM/42 twin mountings, one forward and two aft; eight to 14  anti-aircraft guns with 16,000–28,000 rounds of ammunition, placed in LM/44 mountings; two quadruple  torpedo tubes (8–12 rounds); and 60 mines with four depth charge launchers.

Development
The Type 1936C was intended as an improvement of both the Type 1936A and B destroyers. The Type 1936C was very similar in basic hull and identical in machinery to the Type 1936A, with the major difference between the two being the Type 1936C's use of turbines originally intended for use by the Spähkreuzers, and their heavier firepower.

The first two ships of the class, Z46 and Z47, were ordered on 8 October 1941, and laid down at a later date. Construction was halted in 1942 due to lack of material, but was restarted again in 1943. The construction of the two ships was constantly delayed due to damage from aircraft raids, material supply delays and shortages of copper, among other problems, resulting in very slow progress. The two ships were blown up in 1945 by Allied troops. The other three ships: Z48, Z49, and Z50 were ordered on 12 June 1943, but never laid down.

Ships

References

Citations

Books

External links
Kriegsmarine destroyers

Type 1936 destroyers
 
Proposed ships of Germany